The 1880–81 Football Association Challenge Cup was the tenth staging of the FA Cup, England's oldest football tournament. Sixty-two teams entered, eight more than the previous season, although four of the sixty-two never played a match.

First round

Replays

Second round

Replay

Third round

Fourth round

Fifth round

Semi-finals

Final

References
 FA Cup Results Archive

1880-81
1880–81 in English football
FA Cup